Jan Geert Ankerman (March 2, 1906 in Wommels, Friesland – December 27, 1942 in Rangoon, Burma) was a Dutch field hockey player who competed in the 1928 Summer Olympics. He was a member of the Dutch field hockey team, which won the silver medal. He played all four matches as halfback.

He died in a Japanese camp in Burma during World War II.

References

External links
 
profile

1906 births
1942 deaths
Dutch male field hockey players
Olympic field hockey players of the Netherlands
Field hockey players at the 1928 Summer Olympics
Olympic silver medalists for the Netherlands
Olympic medalists in field hockey
People from Súdwest-Fryslân
Medalists at the 1928 Summer Olympics
Dutch military personnel killed in World War II
Dutch people who died in prison custody
Prisoners who died in Japanese detention
Royal Netherlands East Indies Army personnel of World War II
Royal Netherlands East Indies Army officers
Sportspeople from Friesland
20th-century Dutch people